Masani Amman is a Hindu deity. She is primarily worshipped as a clan deity by certain classes in Tamil Nadu, where she is regarded as an avatar (manifestation) of Mahadevi. Her temple is located in Anaimalai, Pollachi, Coimbatore district of Tamil Nadu state, India.

Arulmigu Masani Amman Temple, also referred as Anaimalai Masani Amman Temple, is a highly revered shrine situated at Anaimalai, which is located about 24 km far south-westerly to Pollachi. It is situated at the confluence of Aliyar River and the Uppar stream, nestled amid grasslands against the backdrop of mighty Anaimalai Hills. The temple enshrines the goddess Arulmigu Masani Amman as the presiding deity. The deity is seen in a lying posture measuring 15 feet from head to foot, which is unique. Other deities worshiped in the complex include neethi kal (stone of justice) and Mahamuniappan. It is a popular belief here that Masani Amman cures any illness if one goes around her trident.

Legend
According to local tradition, during ancient times, Anaimalai was known as Nannur and the region was ruled by Nannuran. He had proclaimed severe punishments on those who plucked fruits from the dense mango grove that belonged to him. One day, a lady happened to consume a fruit not knowing of the strict measures. Nannuran sentences her to death despite the plea of the general public. Later, Nannuran was killed by the villagers in a battle near Vijayamangalam, and a shrine was erected to worship the lady who sacrificed her life. Since the lady was killed, the deity was called as Masani, which meant mango in old Tamil. Later, the deity came to be known as Masaniamman.

See also 
 Devi Kanya Kumari
 Angala Devi
 Isakki

References

External links 

 Official Website
 Arulmigu Masani Amman Temple, Pollachi
 Temple of Justice in Tamil Nadu
 Shrine as a grievance cell

Shaktism
Goddesses